The Dalhousie Formation is a geologic formation in Quebec. It preserves fossils dating back to the Devonian period.

See also

 List of fossiliferous stratigraphic units in Quebec

References
 

Devonian Quebec